San Mateo Mesa is located in McKinley County, New Mexico, approximately 5 miles northwest of San Mateo.  There are two large mesas, called San Mateo Mesa South and San Mateo Mesa North.

Geology
The mesas are capped by the Upper Cretaceous Point Lookout Sandstone, which is underlain by the Crevasse Canyon Formation.

References

Landforms of McKinley County, New Mexico
Mesas of New Mexico